The 1920 Big Ten Conference Men's Golf Championship was held October 22–23, 1920 at the Olympia Fields Country Club in Olympia Fields, Illinois. The team champion was Drake with a match play score of 28 down.

Team results
72 holes of match play was used to determine the team champion.

References

Big Ten Conference men's golf
Big Ten Conference Men's Golf Championship
Big Ten Conference Men's Golf